Armaan Qureshi (born 1 January 1995) is an Indian field hockey player who plays as a forward. He was part of the Indian squad that won the 2016 Men's Hockey Junior World Cup.

Career
Qureshi played cricket until the age of 12 after which he took up hockey. Upon the insistence of his father Rahman Qureshi, a meat shop owner in Gwalior, he gave trials for Sports Authority of India hostel in Bhopal in 2008. He was coached by Ashok Dhyan Chand, son of Dhyan Chand, in Bhopal. Qureshi's uncle Hasrat Qureshi also represented India in field hockey in the 1990s.

Qureshi played for Delhi Waveriders in the 2014 and 2015 seasons of the Hockey India League. Ahead of the 2016 season, he was picked by the Punjab Warriors for $4,500, which he has called the turning point of his career.

References

External links

1995 births
Living people
People from Gwalior
Indian male field hockey players
Field hockey players from Madhya Pradesh
Male field hockey forwards